Cergy-Pontoise is a new town and an agglomeration community in France, in the Val-d'Oise and Yvelines departments, northwest of Paris on the river Oise. It owes its name to two of the communes that it covers, Cergy and Pontoise. Its population is 206,654 (2017), in an area of 84.2 km2. Created in the 1970s, it became an agglomeration community in 2004.

Composition

, the communauté d'agglomération Cergy-Pontoise consists of thirteen communes:

Boisemont
Cergy
Courdimanche
Éragny
Jouy-le-Moutier
Maurecourt
Menucourt
Neuville-sur-Oise
Osny
Pontoise
Puiseux-Pontoise
Saint-Ouen-l'Aumône
Vauréal

Except Maurecourt, which is in the Yvelines department, all communes are part of the Val-d'Oise department.

Population

Since the establishment of the new agglomeration, the population has quadrupled over forty years.

History

In the 1960s, faced by the fast development of Paris and its suburbs, it was decided to control and balance it by creating several new cities around Paris.

To the north, the choice was made on the surroundings of Pontoise.  The old city was to be integrated in a much larger unit, whose center would be Cergy, at the time not more than a village. From 1965, the establishment of the new city was to be done in several stages:

April 16, 1969:  creation of the publicly owned "Établissement public d'aménagement" (EPA)
1971:  creation of the Syndicat communautaire d'aménagement (SCA).
August 11, 1972: official creation of the new city of Cergy-Pontoise, gathering fifteen communes (the eleven current ones, and Boisemont, Boissy-l'Aillerie, Méry-sur-Oise and Pierrelaye).
1983:  the law Rocard amended the new cities.
1984: Syndicat d'agglomération nouvelle (SAN) replaces the SCA, four communes left the structure (the four mentioned above)
December 31, 2002:  end of the mission and dissolution of the EPA, following the completion of the new city.
January 1, 2004:  transformation of the SAN into a communauté d'agglomération.
2004:  Boisemont becomes the 12th commune of Cergy-Pontoise.

Public transport
Bus services are provided by the Stivo (formerly StAN).

Rail services are provided by both the SNCF and the RATP. Two RER lines begin within the new town.

Economy
Subaru France and Bandai France have their head office in Cergy Pontoise.

Media appearances
L'enfance d'une ville, a 1975 movie by Eric Rohmer
I as in Icarus, a 1979 movie by Henri Verneuil
Boyfriends and Girlfriends, a 1987 movie by Eric Rohmer
Water Lilies, a 2007 movie by Céline Sciamma

Twinnings

Cergy-Pontoise is a sister city to the planned cities of
  Columbia, Maryland, United States
  Tres Cantos, Spain
  Erkrath, Germany
  West Lancashire, England (Which includes the planned town of Skelmersdale.)

References

External links

Site of the communauté d'agglomérations 

 
Planned cities
Agglomeration communities in France
Cergy-Pontoise
Cergy-Pontoise
New towns in Île-de-France
New towns started in the 1970s